Jonas Harrow is a fictional supervillain appearing in American comic books published by Marvel Comics. The character is usually depicted as an enemy of Spider-Man.

Publication history
Jonas Harrow's first appearance was in The Amazing Spider-Man #114 (October 1972), and he was created by Gerry Conway and John Romita Sr. Conway recounted that the idea for the character "derived from the first Spider-Stalker story [sic; Conway is referring to the Spider-Slayer story from The Amazing Spider-Man #25], with the scientist who provides Jonah a machine to attack Spider-Man himself. I thought, 'Let's extend that. What if there's a guy out there who basically provides the goods for these guys?' I also realized a lot of Spidey's villains themselves, unless they had been scientists, were not likely to come up with this stuff themselves. ... I thought of Jonas Harrow as a Tony Stark for bad guys".

The character subsequently appears in The Amazing Spider-Man #126 (November 1973), #204 (May 1980), #206 (July 1980), #219 (August 1981), Spider-Man: Hobgoblin Lives #1-2 (January–February 1997), New Avengers #33 (October 2007), House of M: Avengers #1 (January 2008), and Spider-Man: Brand New Day - EXTRA!! (September 2008).

Jonas Harrow received an entry in the All-New Official Handbook of the Marvel Universe A-Z #5 (2006).

Fictional character biography
Over two decades ago, Jonas Harrow was disgraced as a surgeon and expelled from the medical profession for unorthodox experiments. Happening upon a near-dead criminal in the Bowery, Harrow, entertaining half-hearted hopes of redemption, cybernetically restored the criminal, who became the gangster Hammerhead.  Harrow slid deeper into underworld research eventually seeking mind-controlling technology.

In recent years, Harrow enhanced criminals to superhuman status for a fee, the hapless Megawatt his first known subject. When Hammerhead rose to prominence, Harrow observed his ex-patient's battles with Spider-Man, whom he perceived as a challenge. He enhanced another criminal, Kangaroo (Frank Olver), who ungratefully scorned Harrow's schemes. Harrow continued providing services to villains like Living Laser, but when Will o' the Wisp sought removal of his power, Harrow implanted a surgical device to extort him into theft.

When the Wisp rebelled while fighting the intervening Spider-Man, Harrow's device temporarily dissipated him. Using stolen information, Harrow developed a "variator ray" to control human emotion. By now obsessed with Spider-Man, he tested the device on the hero's self-appointed enemy, Daily Bugle publisher J. Jonah Jameson, whom he drove to a nervous breakdown. Gloating, Harrow widened the ray's range to the victims, only to have Spider-Man locate and destroy the ray. Undaunted, Harrow dared Spider-Man to confront him, but was defeated with one punch. Sentenced to Ryker's Island Prison, Harrow learned that inmate Armand DuBroth was blackmailing Warden Percy Rue into allowing DuBroth's use of the prison as a base for criminal activities, including the release of select super-villains. Harrow and the Grey Gargoyle became the latest beneficiaries of DuBroth's scheme, but Spider-Man exposed the operation. Harrow went unheard of for years, although some incorrectly suspected him of being the Hobgoblin.

Harrow accepted a Roxxon Oil contract to create synthetic automated soldiers; to this end, he again extorted industrial crimes from Will O'The Wisp. Surreptitiously seeking Spider-Man's help, the Wisp instead encountered the hero's clone Ben Reilly, who removed Harrow's  implant when the Wisp assumed intangible form, but not before Harrow forced his catspaw to release Dragon Man from custody. When Harrow remotely guided the powerful android to him, Reilly and the Wisp followed and destroyed Harrow's base.

Evading capture, Harrow studied Dragon Man in a subterranean facility, but a subway attack by the vampiric Bonham and his followers accidentally released Harrow's charge, which crashed into the battle Bonham's forces waged against She-Hulk and the Thing. Exposed during the fray and arrested, Harrow was soon at liberty, distributing advanced weapons on the black market to finance new and inhumane experiments. Experiencing chest pains, Harrow phoned for emergency medical assistance before collapsing, but the robots and cyborgs that defended his facility drove off rescuers. Recruited to penetrate the defenses, Iron Fist escorted the stricken scientist to treatment and re-arrest.

Jonas Harrow was hired by the Hood to take advantage of the split in the superhero community caused by the Superhuman Registration Act. He helped invent a power drainer based on a prototype made by Iron Man. When the Hood lost his powers after being defeated by the New Avengers, Harrow attempted to use the power drainer as a bargaining chip to replace the Hood among Norman Osborn's Cabal. Osborn called Harrow in to operate on Luke Cage, and secretly plants a miniature bomb on Cage's heart. However, the Hood soon returned, with new powers granted by the Norse Norn Stones, and blows Harrow's head off with a single magically-charged bullet. His death served as warning to any villain on his side that attempts to double-cross him.

Skills and abilities
Jonas Harrow is a genius in the fields of cybernetics, genetics, mechanics, and surgery. He requires medication for a heart condition.

Other versions

House of M
In the House of M reality, Jonas Harrow appears in a flashback and was among the scientists (along with Michael Morbius and Farley Stillwell) who experimented on Luke Cage.

References

Characters created by Gerry Conway
Characters created by John Romita Sr.
Comics characters introduced in 1972
Fictional characters from New York (state)
Fictional geneticists
Fictional mechanics
Fictional surgeons
Marvel Comics male supervillains
Marvel Comics scientists
Marvel Comics supervillains
Spider-Man characters